The Opposition in the Australian state of Tasmania comprises the largest party or coalition of parties not in Government.  The Opposition's purpose is to hold the Government to account and constitute a "Government-in-waiting" should the existing Government fall. To that end, a Leader of the Opposition and Shadow Ministers for the various government departments question the Premier and Ministers on Government policy and administration, and formulate the policy the Opposition would pursue in Government. It is sometimes styled "His Majesty's Loyal Opposition" to demonstrate that although it opposes the Government, it remains loyal to the King.

The current Leader of the Opposition is Labor Leader David O’Byrne, and Anita Dow is the Deputy Leader.

Most Recent Shadow Ministry 
The most recent shadow ministry was announced on 13 July 2021. It is led by Opposition Leader Rebecca White.

See also
Government of Tasmania
Opposition (Australia)

References

Politics of Tasmania